Francisco Antonio Rodríguez Brito (born September 20, 1945) is a retired Venezuelan boxer. At the 1968 Summer Olympics in Mexico City he won the gold medal in the inaugural men's light flyweight (– 48 kg) division, after having claimed the gold as well at the 1967 and 1971 Pan American Games. He carried the flag for his native country at the opening ceremony at the 1972 Summer Olympics in Munich, West Germany.

Amateur career
Rodriguez, nicknamed "Morochito", was Venezuela's first Olympic gold medalist, winning gold in the light flyweight division in its inaugural year of competition, 1968. His amateur record stood at 266 wins, 4 losses.

After the Olympics, Rodríguez signed a professional contract. Before fighting he took his mother to a pro bout. At one point, one of the boxers' bloody mouthpieces landed in Rodriguez's mother's lap. She begged Rodriguez to give up fighting and he cancelled his contract.

Olympic results
Mexico City - 1968
 Round of 32: bye
 Round of 16: Defeated Rafael Carbonell (Cuba) on points, 5-0
 Quarterfinal: Defeated Hatha Karunaratne (Ceylon) by a second-round TKO
 Semifinal: Defeated Harlan Marbley (United States) on points, 4-1
 Final: Defeated Jee Yong-Ju (South Korea) on points, 3-2 (won gold medal)

Munich - 1972
Lost to Dennis Talbot (Australia) KO 2

Honors
He was inducted into the Venezuelan Sports Hall of Fame in 1988.

References

1945 births
Living people
People from Cumaná
Boxers at the 1967 Pan American Games
Boxers at the 1971 Pan American Games
Pan American Games gold medalists for Venezuela
Boxers at the 1968 Summer Olympics
Boxers at the 1972 Summer Olympics
Olympic boxers of Venezuela
Olympic gold medalists for Venezuela
Olympic medalists in boxing
Medalists at the 1968 Summer Olympics
Venezuelan male boxers
Pan American Games medalists in boxing
Flyweight boxers
Medalists at the 1967 Pan American Games
Medalists at the 1971 Pan American Games